The Thomas Morin Reserve is an Indian reserve of the Peter Ballantyne Cree Nation in Saskatchewan. It is in the city of Flin Flon.

References

Indian reserves in Saskatchewan
Urban Indian reserves in Canada
Flin Flon
Peter Ballantyne Cree Nation